RDHS may refer to:
 Regina Dominican High School, Wilmette, Illinois, United States
 River Dell Regional High School, Oradell, New Jersey, United States
 Rockland District High School, Rockland, Ontario, Canada